Justinas Kinderis (born 24 May 1987, Panevėžys) is a male Lithuanian modern pentathlete who won a bronze medal at 2010 World Modern Pentathlon Championships. He competed at the 2012 Summer Olympics in the Modern pentathlon.  At the 2014 World Championships, he won the mixed relay with Laura Asadauskaité.

At the 2021 Lithuanian Fencing Championships Justinas become national champion in fencing.

Justinas participated at the 2020 Tokyo Olympics and finished 18 in Modern pentathlon.

References
 

1987 births
Lithuanian male modern pentathletes
Modern pentathletes at the 2012 Summer Olympics
Modern pentathletes at the 2016 Summer Olympics
Olympic modern pentathletes of Lithuania
Sportspeople from Vilnius
Living people
World Modern Pentathlon Championships medalists
Lithuanian male fencers
Modern pentathletes at the 2020 Summer Olympics
21st-century Lithuanian people